Burnside Project is a New York–based electropop, indie rock band featuring Richard Jankovich, Gerald Hammill, and Paul Searing.

In 2000, Jankovich released the self-titled Burnside Project CD independently which led to interest from record labels including Bar/None, whom Jankovich signed with in 2002. The album has been described as "some sort of bizarre pairing of DJ Spooky and Paul Westerberg." This album was subsequently re-mastered and re-packaged for wide release in 2007 on Fraga Records.

Burnside Project's Bar/None debut, The Networks, the Circuits, the Streams, the Harmonies was released in 2003. The album began charting on college radio stations across the country (including heavy rotation on Seattle’s KEXP), and received high praise in mainstream publications, earning an A- in SPIN and placement on Rolling Stone’s “Hot List.” It was also nominated for the Shortlist Music Prize that year by acclaimed writer/director, Cameron Crowe.

The single "Cue the Pulse to Begin", from The Networks, the Circuits, the Streams, the Harmonies, was used as the theme song to seasons 4 and 5 of the US TV series Queer as Folk. "Cue The Pulse To Begin" also became a top 10 radio hit in Japan when "Networks" was released on Sony/DefSTAR in 2004. The band toured the country in support of the release in Summer of 2004.

The follow-up album in 2005, The Finest Example is You, featured the singles "And So It Goes" and "One to One." Entertainment Weekly proclaimed The Finest Example is You “an apt title, since their songs are great examples of where indie rock should be headed." Burnside Project hasn't performed live since April 2006.

On September 9, 2016, the band released Syntax and Semantics, their fourth album on Bar/None Records.

In late 2022, the band began releasing previously unavailable remixes on digital audio services.

Discography
Studio albums
 Burnside Project (2000 / Remastered 2007)
 The Networks, the Circuits, the Streams, the Harmonies (2003)
 The Finest Example Is You (2005)
 Syntax and Semantics (2016)

References

External links
 Official Burnside Project site
 Official Pocket Mix site
 Bar-None Burnside Project Page

Indie rock musical groups from New York (state)
Electronic music groups from New York (state)
Musical groups established in 2000
Musical groups from New York City